Scott Garthwaite (born 22 January 1980) also known by his TV name 'Punk Chef, is a professional Chef and a TV Chef Presenter. He has appeared in several TV cooking shows showcasing sign language with food which has made him one of the first celebrity Deaf chef to emerge in mainstream television.

Early life 
Garthwaite was born and raised in Hartlepool in the North East of England. He was born hearing and at the age of 2 as he was diagnosed with meningitis that turned him deaf. He left his deaf school in Middlesbrough with seven GCSE qualifications. Garthwaite learned his culinary trade in 2003 after living temporarily in Jordan. He enrolled at Hartlepool College of Further Education then went on to completed a Degree in Culinary and Patisseries Art from Newcastle College in partnership with Leeds Metropolitan University.

Career
Garthwaite started his culinary training at Rockliffe Hall in Hurworth, Darlington then later he went on to work at Truffle Restaurant in Darlington. While he was studying for his degree as he began to make videos blogs in British Sign Language for social media for the deaf community and he was noticed by Flashing Lights, a deaf led production company, who then created the Punk Chef  TV cooking series for the deaf community. Garthwaite went on to make 9 programmes for BSL Zone which include Punk Chef's Kids Challenge. He said "The programme aims to show the deaf community how easy it is to make simple and tasty meals and that their disability should not be seen as a barrier to learning a new skill, the fact that I’m deaf myself means that I’m able to relate to deaf people on a much more personal level, making it easier to guide them through the cooking process. Chefs like Jamie Oliver, Gordon Ramsay and Heston Blumenthal have been inspiring people to improve their cooking habits for years, so it’s great to be able to do the same for the deaf community".

In December 2015, Garthwaite made an appearance on BBC Two's See Hear.

In November 2017, in an appearance on BSL Zone's Up For It kids programme, Garthwaite was invited to meet a young deaf chef.

2018 - 2019
Punk Chef on the Road TV Series. Scott toured around the UK to talk about food in each city with special guests. This can be seen on BSL Zone.

Football 
Garthwaite was the manager of Sunderland Deaf Association Football Club, a community football club under Sunderland AFC's charity the Foundation of Light. He became the first deaf manager in the history of North East to win the England Deaf Football League and Cup double also the first manager to bring home the England Deaf Football Challenge Cup to the North East for the first time in its history

Awards 
In recognition of his work, Garthwaite was awarded the North East regional Sound Barrier Stars top award for his culinary talent and inspiration to his community for his work on screen as Punk Chef in 2013, also he was selected to compete in the finals to representing England at International Gastronomy Deaf Culinary Event in Copenhagen, Denmark as part of an eight-man shortlist in 2014, then the following year 2015 he was selected once again and he was awarded the second place at the International Gastronomy Deaf Culinary Event after walking away empty-handed in 2014.

Television

References

1980 births
Living people
Deaf television presenters
English television chefs
English chefs
English deaf people
BSL users